The Pigeon HAS to Go to School! is a children's book by Mo Willems. Published by Hyperion Books for Children in 2019, it is about a pigeon who must go to school, but frets about math, learning the alphabet, heavy backpacks, and what the teacher and other birds would think of him.

Reception
Kirkus Book Reviews wrote: "All the typical worries and excuses kids have about school are filtered through Willems’ hysterical, bus-loving Pigeon." and "Yes, the Pigeon has to go to school, and so do readers, and this book will surely ease the way."

Film adaptation
An animated short film based on the book was released in 2019 (the same year the book was released) by Weston Woods Studios, with narration by Willems and the additional voices of students from Side by Side School in Norwalk, CT. The film runs for 8 minutes and 20 seconds. It was directed by Pete List.

References

2019 children's books
American picture books
Fictional passerine birds
Schools in fiction